Siri Hov Eggen (born 8 December 1969) is a Norwegian politician for the Labour Party.

She served as a deputy representative to the Parliament of Norway from Akershus during the terms 2001–2005 and 2009–2013.

She hails from Vestby. In 2012 she became a member of Akershus University Hospital. She has also been deputy county mayor of Akershus.

References

1969 births
Living people
People from Vestby
Deputy members of the Storting
Labour Party (Norway) politicians
Akershus politicians
Women members of the Storting